The International Convention Centre, formerly known as the Birendra International Convention Centre (BICC), is a major conference venue in Nepal. Located in New Baneshwor, Kathmandu, it currently houses the Federal Parliament of Nepal. The complex uniquely blends Nepalese and modern architecture to create a luxuriously decorated solid structure with multifunctional modern facilities. Built under gratis by China, the BICC was formally inaugurated in 1993 AD.

See also
Godavari Sunrise Convention Center
List of convention and exhibition centers

References

External links
 Official Website

Buildings and structures in Kathmandu
Convention centers in Nepal
1993 establishments in Nepal